In mathematics, the geometric mean is a mean or average which indicates a central tendency of a finite set of real numbers by using the product of their values (as opposed to the arithmetic mean which uses their sum).  The geometric mean is defined as the th root of the product of  numbers, i.e., for a set of numbers , the geometric mean is defined as

or, equivalently, as the arithmetic mean in logscale:

Most commonly the numbers are restricted to being non-negative, to avoid complications related to negative numbers not having real roots, and frequently they are restricted to being positive,  to enable the use of logarithms.

For instance, the geometric mean of two numbers, say 2 and 8, is just the square root of their product, that is, . As another example, the geometric mean of the three numbers 4, 1, and 1/32 is the cube root of their product (1/8), which is 1/2, that is, .

The geometric mean is often used for a set of numbers whose values are meant to be multiplied together or are exponential in nature, such as a set of growth figures:  values of the human population or interest rates of a financial investment over time. It also applies to benchmarking, where it is particularly useful for computing means of speedup ratios: since the mean of 0.5x (half as fast) and 2x (twice as fast) will be 1 (i.e., no speedup overall).

The geometric mean can be understood in terms of geometry.

The geometric mean is one of the three classical Pythagorean means, together with the arithmetic mean and the harmonic mean. For all positive data sets containing at least one pair of unequal values, the harmonic mean is always the least of the three means, while the arithmetic mean is always the greatest of the three and the geometric mean is always in between (see Inequality of arithmetic and geometric means.)

Calculation
The geometric mean of a data set  is given by:

The above figure uses capital pi notation to show a series of multiplications. Each side of the equal sign shows that a set of values is multiplied in succession (the number of values is represented by "n") to give a total product of the set, and then the nth root of the total product is taken to give the geometric mean of the original set. The exponent  on the left side is equivalent to the taking nth root. For example, .

Iterative means
The geometric mean of a data set is less than the data set's arithmetic mean unless all members of the data set are equal, in which case the geometric and arithmetic means are equal. This allows the definition of the arithmetic-geometric mean, an intersection of the two which always lies in between.

and

The sequences converge to a common limit, and the geometric mean is preserved:

Replacing the arithmetic and harmonic mean by a pair of generalized means of opposite, finite exponents yields the same result.

Relationship with logarithms 
The geometric mean can also be expressed as the exponential of the arithmetic mean of logarithms. By using logarithmic identities to transform the formula, the multiplications can be expressed as a sum and the power as a multiplication:

When 
  
As: 
 
alternatively, use any positive real number base, for both the logarithms and the number you are raising to the power of the arithmetic mean of the individual logarithms at that same base. 
   
where  is the number of negative numbers.

This is sometimes called the log-average (not to be confused with the logarithmic average). For example, the geometric mean of 2 and 8 can be calculated as the following, where  is any base of a logarithm (commonly 2,  or 10):

Related to the above, it can be seen that for a given sample of points , the geometric mean is the minimizer of 
, 
whereas the arithmetic mean is the minimizer of 
. 
Thus, the geometric mean provides a summary of the samples whose exponent best matches the exponents of the samples (in the least squares sense).

The log form of the geometric mean is generally the preferred alternative for implementation in computer languages because calculating the product of many numbers can lead to an arithmetic overflow or arithmetic underflow. This is less likely to occur with the sum of the logarithms for each number.

Comparison to arithmetic mean

The geometric mean of a non-empty data set of (positive) numbers is always at most their arithmetic mean. Equality is only obtained when all numbers in the data set are equal; otherwise, the geometric mean is smaller. For example, the geometric mean of 2 and 3 is 2.45, while their arithmetic mean is 2.5. In particular, this means that when a set of non-identical numbers is subjected to a mean-preserving spread — that is, the elements of the set are "spread apart" more from each other while leaving the arithmetic mean unchanged — their geometric mean decreases.

Average growth rate
In many cases the geometric mean is the best measure to determine the average growth rate of some quantity. (For example, if in one year sales increases by 80% and the next year by 25%, the end result is the same as that of a constant growth rate of 50%, since the geometric mean of 1.80 and 1.25 is 1.50.) In order to determine the average growth rate, it is not necessary to take the product of the measured growth rates at every step. Let the quantity be given as the sequence , where  is the number of steps from the initial to final state. The geometric mean of these growth rates is then just:

Application to normalized values

 

This makes the geometric mean the only correct mean when averaging normalized results; that is, results that are presented as ratios to reference values.  This is the case when presenting computer performance with respect to a reference computer, or when computing a single average index from several heterogeneous sources (for example, life expectancy, education years, and infant mortality).  In this scenario, using the arithmetic or harmonic mean would change the ranking of the results depending on what is used as a reference.  For example, take the following comparison of execution time of computer programs:

Table 1

The arithmetic and geometric means "agree" that computer C is the fastest.  However, by presenting appropriately normalized values and using the arithmetic mean, we can show either of the other two computers to be the fastest.  Normalizing by A's result gives A as the fastest computer according to the arithmetic mean:

Table 2

while normalizing by B's result gives B as the fastest computer according to the arithmetic mean but A as the fastest according to the harmonic mean:

Table 3

and normalizing by C's result gives C as the fastest computer according to the arithmetic mean but A as the fastest according to the harmonic mean:

Table 4

In all cases, the ranking given by the geometric mean stays the same as the one obtained with unnormalized values.

However, this reasoning has been questioned.
Giving consistent results is not always equal to giving the correct results. In general, it is more rigorous to assign weights to each of the programs, calculate the average weighted execution time (using the arithmetic mean), and then normalize that result to one of the computers. The three tables above just give a different weight to each of the programs, explaining the inconsistent results of the arithmetic and harmonic means (Table 4 gives equal weight to both programs, the Table 2 gives a weight of 1/1000 to the second program, and the Table 3 gives a weight of 1/100 to the second program and 1/10 to the first one). The use of the geometric mean for aggregating performance numbers should be avoided if possible, because multiplying execution times has no physical meaning, in contrast to adding times as in the arithmetic mean. Metrics that are inversely proportional to time (speedup, IPC) should be averaged using the harmonic mean.

The geometric mean can be derived from the generalized mean as its limit as  goes to zero. Similarly,  this is possible for the weighted geometric mean.

Geometric mean of a continuous function
If  is a positive continuous real-valued function, its geometric mean over this interval is

Applications

Proportional growth

The geometric mean is more appropriate than the arithmetic mean for describing proportional growth, both exponential growth (constant proportional growth) and varying growth; in business the geometric mean of growth rates is known as the compound annual growth rate (CAGR). The geometric mean of growth over periods yields the equivalent constant growth rate that would yield the same final amount.

Suppose an orange tree yields 100 oranges one year and then 180, 210 and 300 the following years, so the growth is 80%, 16.6666% and 42.8571% for each year respectively. Using the arithmetic mean calculates a (linear) average growth of 46.5079% (80% + 16.6666% + 42.8571%, that sum then divided by 3). However, if we start with 100 oranges and let it grow 46.5079% each year, the result is 314 oranges, not 300, so the linear average over-states the year-on-year growth.

Instead, we can use the geometric mean. Growing with 80% corresponds to multiplying with 1.80, so we take the geometric mean of 1.80, 1.166666 and 1.428571, i.e. ; thus the "average" growth per year is 44.2249%. If we start with 100 oranges and let the number grow with 44.2249% each year, the result is 300 oranges.

Financial
The geometric mean has from time to time been used to calculate financial indices (the averaging is over the components of the index). For example, in the past the FT 30 index used a geometric mean. It is also used in the recently introduced "RPIJ" measure of inflation in the United Kingdom and in the European Union.

This has the effect of understating movements in the index compared to using the arithmetic mean.

Applications in the social sciences

Although the geometric mean has been relatively rare in computing social statistics, starting from 2010 the United Nations Human Development Index did switch to this mode of calculation, on the grounds that it better reflected the non-substitutable nature of the statistics being compiled and compared:
 The geometric mean decreases the level of substitutability between dimensions [being compared] and at the same time ensures that a 1 percent decline in say life expectancy at birth has the same impact on the HDI as a 1 percent decline in education or income. Thus, as a basis for comparisons of achievements, this method is also more respectful of the intrinsic differences across the dimensions than a simple average.

Not all values used to compute the HDI (Human Development Index) are normalized; some of them instead have the form . This makes the choice of the geometric mean less obvious than one would expect from the "Properties" section above.

The equally distributed welfare equivalent income associated with an Atkinson Index with an inequality aversion parameter of 1.0 is simply the geometric mean of incomes. For values other than one, the equivalent value is an Lp norm divided by the number of elements, with p equal to one minus the inequality aversion parameter.

Geometry

In the case of a right triangle, its altitude is the length of a line extending perpendicularly from the hypotenuse to its 90° vertex. Imagining that this line splits the hypotenuse into two segments, the geometric mean of these segment lengths is the length of the altitude. This property is known as the geometric mean theorem.

In an ellipse, the semi-minor axis is the geometric mean of the maximum and minimum distances of the ellipse from a focus; it is also the geometric mean of the semi-major axis and the semi-latus rectum. The semi-major axis of an ellipse is the geometric mean of the distance from the center to either focus and the distance from the center to either directrix.
 
Another way to think about it is as follows:

Consider a circle with radius .
 
Since the area of the circle and the ellipse stays the same, we have:

The radius of the circle is the geometric mean of the  semi-major and the semi-minor axes of the ellipse formed by deforming the circle.

Distance to the horizon of a sphere (ignoring the effect of atmospheric refraction when atmosphere is present) is equal to the geometric mean of the distance to the closest point of the sphere and the distance to the farthest point of the sphere.

The geometric mean is used in both in the approximation of squaring the circle by S.A. Ramanujan and in the construction of the heptadecagon with "mean proportionals".

Aspect ratios

The geometric mean has been used in choosing a compromise aspect ratio in film and video: given two aspect ratios, the geometric mean of them provides a compromise between them, distorting or cropping both in some sense equally. Concretely, two equal area rectangles (with the same center and parallel sides) of different aspect ratios intersect in a rectangle whose aspect ratio is the geometric mean, and their hull (smallest rectangle which contains both of them) likewise has the aspect ratio of their geometric mean.

This was discovered empirically by Kerns Powers, who cut out rectangles with equal areas and shaped them to match each of the popular aspect ratios. When overlapped with their center points aligned, he found that all of those aspect ratio rectangles fit within an outer rectangle with an aspect ratio of 1.77:1 and all of them also covered a smaller common inner rectangle with the same aspect ratio 1.77:1. The intermediate ratios have no effect on the result, only the two extreme ratios.

Applying the same geometric mean technique to 16:9 and 4:3 approximately yields the 14:9 (...) aspect ratio, which is likewise used as a compromise between these ratios.

Paper formats 
The geometric mean is also used to calculate B and C series paper formats.

The same principle applies with the C series, whose area is the geometric mean of the A and B series. For example, the C4 format has an area which is the geometric mean of the areas of A4 and B4.

An advantage that comes from this relationship is that an A4 paper fits inside a C4 envelope, and both fit inside a B4 envelope.

Other applications
Spectral flatness: in signal processing, spectral flatness, a measure of how flat or spiky a spectrum is, is defined as the ratio of the geometric mean of the power spectrum to its arithmetic mean.
Anti-reflective coatings: In optical coatings, where reflection needs to be minimised between two media of refractive indices n0 and n2, the optimum refractive index n1 of the anti-reflective coating is given by the geometric mean: .
Subtractive color mixing: The spectral reflectance curve for paint mixtures (of equal tinting strength, opacity and dilution) is approximately the geometric mean of the paints' individual reflectance curves computed at each wavelength of their spectra.
Image processing: The geometric mean filter is used as a noise filter in image processing.
Labor compensation: The geometric mean of a subsistence wage and market value of the labor using capital of employer was suggested as the natural wage by Johann von Thünen in 1875.

See also

Arithmetic-geometric mean
Generalized mean
Geometric mean theorem
Geometric standard deviation
Harmonic mean
Heronian mean
Heteroscedasticity
Log-normal distribution
Muirhead's inequality
Product
Pythagorean means
Quadratic mean
Quadrature (mathematics)
Quasi-arithmetic mean (generalized f-mean)
Rate of return
Weighted geometric mean

Notes and references

External links
Calculation of the geometric mean of two numbers in comparison to the arithmetic solution
Arithmetic and geometric means
When to use the geometric mean
Practical solutions for calculating geometric mean with different kinds of data 
Geometric Mean on MathWorld
Geometric Meaning of the Geometric Mean
Geometric Mean Calculator for larger data sets
Computing Congressional apportionment using Geometric Mean 
Non-Newtonian calculus website
Geometric Mean Definition and Formula
 The Distribution of the Geometric Mean
 The geometric mean?

Means
Non-Newtonian calculus